Pierre Jaccoud (November 24, 1905 – July 4, 1996) was a Swiss lawyer and Radical Party politician in Geneva. He was convicted of the murder of Charles Zumbach in a trial that remains controversial to this day.

Jaccoud had "been Aly Khan's attorney during his divorce from Rita Hayworth, and he represented innumerable Swiss and foreign companies in Geneva's tightly controlled banking community."

Jaccoud was accused of having murdered Charles Zumbach on 1 May 1958, in Plan-les-Ouates, near Geneva. After a business trip to Sweden and on "his return to Geneva in June 1958, Jaccoud was arrested." Jaccoud's court case is also known as L'Affaire Poupette.

After a trial, he was convicted of the murder and sentenced to seven years in prison.

External links
Sylvie Arsever, Affaire Jaccoud: l'ombre d'un doute?, Le Temps, 9 July 2007.
L'Affaire Poupette, Time magazine, 1 February 1960.
The Verdict, Time magazine, 15 February 1960

Thrilling Cities
 Ian Fleming wrote about the case in detail in the Geneva Chapter of Thrilling Cities.

Bibliography
Stéphane Jourat, L Affaire Jaccoud, Editor: Fleuve Noir, 1992.

Sources

1905 births
1996 deaths
Lawyers from Geneva
Free Democratic Party of Switzerland politicians
Politicians from Geneva
Swiss people convicted of murder
People convicted of murder by Switzerland
20th-century Swiss lawyers